is a Japanese actress, singer, tarento and figure skater from Kyoto Prefecture. She is represented by Oscar Promotion, having previously been represented by Theatre Academy.

Biography

Career
Miyu Honda made her debut in the entertainment world in 2010, when she starred in an advertisement for Pizza Hut. She also played minor roles in several Japanese television dramas like Wataru Seken wa Oni Bakari (2011, TBS), Ikemen desu ne (2011, TBS) and Marumo no Okite (2011, CX). She was also featured in the 2011 film Gantz: Perfect Answer in her debut film role.

However, Miyu Honda only rose to prominence after starring in the 2011 Nippon Television television drama Kaseifu no Mita. She played the role of Kii Asuda in this popular drama, which garnered an average viewership rating of 25.2%, the highest for any television drama in 2011. She has been compared to Mana Ashida, another child actress who was the lead star in Marumo no Okite, for her role in this drama.

In 2012, Miyu starred in the television drama Kodomo Keisatsu, in which she plays the role of Maiko Hayashi alongside Fuku Suzuki, another child actor who at the time was from the same agency. She was also featured in the drama Summer Rescue, where she plays the role of Momoka Hirahara, the daughter of a veteran nurse (played by actress Eiko Koike). In 2018, she voiced both of the titular characters in the anime film Liz and the Blue Bird by Kyoto Animation.

In addition to television dramas, Miyu has also been featured in the music video of the song Futari Hitotsu by singer-songwriter Rake. She was also featured in 14th Tokyo Girls Collection Spring/Summer Collection 2012 as a fashion model.

From July 2013 she switched her talent agency changed to Oscar Promotion.

Personal life
Miyu Honda is the fourth of five children in her family. She started to learn ice hockey when she was three years old, and formally took up figure skating when she was four years old. She attributed her interest to her eldest brother, Taichi, who is also a figure skater. Her older sister, Marin, is the 2016 World Junior Champion. In a figure skating competition organized by Kansai University in 2011, Miyu achieved the first position in the 3rd grader category.

Filmography

Television dramas
 Wataru Seken wa Oni Bakari (2011, TBS) - Mari
 Sayonara Bokutachi no Youchien (2011, NTV) - Mikoto Mochida
 Marumo no Okite (2011, CX, episode 3–10) - Manami Endo
 Ikemen desu ne (2011, TBS, episode 1)
 I am Mita, Your Housekeeper (2011, NTV) - Kii Asuda
 Kodomo Keisatsu (2012, TBS) - Maiko Hayashi
 Summer Rescue (2012, TBS) - Momoka Hirahara
 Kodomo Keishi (2013,TBS)
 Jui-san Jikendesuyo (2014, YTV, ep1,5) as Aoi Asano
 Keibuho Sugiyama Shintaro (2015, TBS) as Miharu Sugiyama
 The Supporting Actors 2 (2018, TV Tokyo) as herself
 The Supporting Actors 3 (2021, TV Tokyo) as herself
 Boy's Abyss (2022, MBS) as Sakuko Akiyama

Films
 Gantz: Perfect Answer (2011)
 Yellow Elephant (2012)
 The Letters (2015) as Chiaki Hoshino
 Haha to Kuraseba (2015) as Tamiko
 Kisaragi Station (2022)
 Soreike! Gateball Sakura-gumi (2023)

Anime
Liz and the Blue Bird (2018) as both Liz and the unnamed blue bird (mysterious girl)

Dubbing
The BFG (2016) as Sophie (Ruby Barnhill)

References

External links
  
  
 

2004 births
Living people
Actresses from Kyoto
Japanese child actresses
Japanese television actresses
Japanese film actresses
Japanese female single skaters
21st-century Japanese actresses
Japanese women singers